Miki Itakura (born August 1, 1975 in Ishikawa, Japan) is a retired Japanese female race walker. She competed for Japan at the 1992 Summer Olympics.

Achievements

References
sports-reference

1975 births
Living people
Japanese female racewalkers
Athletes (track and field) at the 1992 Summer Olympics
Olympic athletes of Japan
Sportspeople from Ishikawa Prefecture
20th-century Japanese women